J'Ada Mergeaux Finch-Sheen is a U.S. Virgin Islands lawyer and businessperson who served as the territory's first female Attorney General and acting Governor.

Education 
J'Ada Mergeaux Finch-Sheen completed a bachelor's degree in 1975 at the College of the Virgin Islands. She earned a J.D., cum laude, from Howard University School of Law in 1978.

Career 
Finch-Sheen became an assistant attorney general in the United States Virgin Islands Department of Justice in 1979. In early 1982, she became chief of the criminal and family division.  In 1982, she became the first female Attorney General of the United States Virgin Islands. She served as acting Governor of the U.S. Virgin Islands in December 1983, becoming the territory's first female Governor. She resigned as Attorney General in 1985.

In 1998, Finch-Sheen became the chief executive officer of the Daily News Publishing Co.

Personal life 
In 1985, Finch-Sheen moved to Santo Domingo. Her husband, Albert Sheen, is a federal bankruptcy court judge.

References 

Living people
Year of birth missing (living people)
Place of birth missing (living people)
United States Virgin Islands lawyers
African-American women lawyers
African-American lawyers
African-American business executives
American women chief executives
American publishing chief executives
American chief executives in the media industry
20th-century American lawyers
21st-century American lawyers
20th-century American businesswomen
20th-century American businesspeople
21st-century American businesswomen
21st-century American businesspeople
University of the Virgin Islands alumni
Howard University School of Law alumni
United States Virgin Islands businesspeople
Immigrants to the Dominican Republic
Governors of the United States Virgin Islands
20th-century American women lawyers
21st-century American women lawyers
20th-century African-American women
20th-century African-American people
21st-century African-American women
21st-century African-American people